Acrobrycon is a genus of characin found in tropical South America.

Species
There are currently 3 recognized species in this genus:
 Acrobrycon ipanquianus (Cope, 1877)
 Acrobrycon ortii Arcila-Mesa, Vari & Menezes, 2014 
 Acrobrycon starnesi Arcila-Mesa, Vari & Menezes, 2014

References

Characidae
Fish of South America
Tropical fish